Dov Lando  (born 5 April 1930) is the rosh yeshiva of the Slabodka yeshiva of Bnei Brak along with Rabbi Moshe Hillel Hirsch, a rabbi of Chug Chazon Ish, and a member of the directorate of the Board of Yeshivas. In his youth, he studied under Avrohom Yeshaya Karelitz as well as at the yeshivot of Ponevezh and Hebron.

Works 

 Zecher Davar
 Zecher Tov
 Minchat Davar, regarding the Minchat Chinuch
 Collection of lessons (with the other heads of the Slabodka Yeshiva)
 Pamphlets on new interpretations regarding all Shas tractates

Students 

 Avraham Gnichowski, Rosh Yeshiva of the Tchebein Yeshiva
 Michal Zilber, Rosh Yeshiva of the Zhvil Yeshiva
 Zvi Meir Silberberg, a Hasidic influencer
 Yehuda Silman
 Shaul Alter, Rosh Yeshiva of the Ger Yeshiva
 Moshe Yehuda Schlesinger, Rosh Yeshiva of the Kol Torah Yeshiva
 Shalom Meir Jungerman, Rosh Yeshiva of the Zichron Michael Yeshiva
 Daniel Wolfson, Rosh Yeshiva of Yeshiva Netivot Chochma

External links 
 Shiurim by Harav Dov Lando

References 

Israeli Rosh yeshivas
Ponevezh Yeshiva alumni
Polish emigrants to Israel
1930 births
Living people
Rabbis in Bnei Brak
Academic staff of Slabodka yeshiva